X-type histiocytoses are a clinically well-defined group of cutaneous syndromes characterized by infiltrates of Langerhans cells, as opposed to Non-X histiocytosis in which the infiltrates contain monocytes/macrophages.  Conditions included in this group are:

 Congenital self-healing reticulohistiocytosis
 Langerhans cell histiocytosis

See also 
 Non-X histiocytosis
 Histiocytosis

References 

Monocyte- and macrophage-related cutaneous conditions
Histiocytosis